Seamon Glass (September 26, 1925 – July 12, 2016) was an American actor and author. He acted in film and television from the early 1960s to the early 1990s. He appeared in the films This Is Not a Test (1962), Deliverance (1972), Bootleggers (1974), and Winterhawk (1975).

Background
He was born in Brooklyn, New York, on September 26, 1925. He died in Los Angeles on July 12, 2016. His family's name was originally "Altglas" but changed to "Glass".  His father died when he was 13 years of age with the family moving to California.

World War II

With his mother's permission, he joined the U.S. Marine Corps at the age of 17 during World War II, serving in British Samoa and the Marshall Islands.  He received a disability pension after suffering a hearing loss during a Japanese bombing raid. Glass was sent to the brig four times, His novel of his service in a Marine aviation unit entitled The Half Ass Marines was published in 2010.

Postwar career
Following the war Glass attended Santa Monica Junior College on the G.I. Bill where he became heavyweight boxing champion of the college; the experience leading him into amateur and professional boxing.
 
He held a variety of jobs including Merchant Mariner, school teacher of English and Social Studies as well as guidance counselor at Fairfax High School in Los Angeles, bartender, newspaper columnist for the Santa Monica Independence and bodyguard for Darryl F. Zanuck's daughter Darrylin.

Glass had a brief professional boxing career in 1960 in Los Angeles, compiling a record of 1–2. where he was sponsored by actress Anna Maria Alberghetti.

Hollywood career
When acting as a boxing instructor and sparring partner, Glass met many actors and Hollywood film people who wanted to box but did not want any damage to their faces or to be hurt. One of his clients was producer and director Fred Gadette who found him several acting roles and stunt work experiences.

1960s
He was the lead actor in This Is Not A Test (1962), a film about a lawman who sets up a roadblock to catch a criminal then hears on the radio that there is going to be a nuclear attack. He also appeared in Star Trek, in the episode "Mudd's Women" as Benton (1966).

Glass turned down extra work requirements in films such as Kid Galahad (1962) and Captain Newman, M.D. leading to his appearances in the films to be reduced with Glass preferring the rewards and financial security of teaching and seaman jobs to the non reliability of an acting career. His agent, the former actor Hugh French dropped him when Glass's taking a merchant voyage led him to lose a role that was requested by John Wayne, possibly the Sons of Katie Elder.,

1970s
Glass was the menacing 'First Griner' in John Boorman's film Deliverance (1972). He played staff member Tim Donahue in the film The Other Side of Hell (1978), about a mental inmate played by Alan Arkin who regains his sanity and wants to leave the hospital.

Glass returned to teaching by leaving America and working in China.

Filmography

Publication
 Half-Assed Marines. . 2010

References

External links
 The Classic TV History Blog: An Interview With Seamon Glass, June 26, 2014
 

1925 births
2016 deaths
Male actors from New York City
Writers from Brooklyn
United States Marines
American people of Polish descent
United States Marine Corps personnel of World War II